The following is a list of notable deaths in May 2015.

Entries for each day are listed alphabetically by surname. A typical entry lists information in the following sequence:
Name, age, country of citizenship and reason for notability, established cause of death, reference.

May 2015

1
Stephen Milburn Anderson, 67, American film director, writer and producer, throat cancer.
Jamie Bishop, 44, Welsh cricketer (Glamorgan).
Pete Brown, 80, American professional golfer.
José Canalejas, 90, Spanish actor (Django, The Ugly Ones, The Mercenary).
Ray Ceresino, 86, Canadian ice hockey player (Toronto Maple Leafs).
Amitabha Chowdhury, 87, Indian journalist.
David Day, 63, Australian radio broadcaster (Triple M Adelaide).
Petro Didyk, 54, Ukrainian footballer, traffic collision.
Geoff Duke, 92, British motorcycle racer, six-time Grand Prix world champion.
Harry Geisinger, 81, American politician, member of the Georgia House of Representatives (1969–1974, since 2005), leukemia.
Dave Goldberg, 47, American executive (SurveyMonkey, LAUNCH Media), head trauma from treadmill fall.
Vafa Guluzade, 74, Azerbaijani diplomat and political scientist.
Leonard Haber, 82, American psychologist, politician and radio show host, Mayor of Miami Beach, Florida (1977–1979).
John Hansen, 97, American politician.
Alexander Kok, 89, South African-born British cellist.
Amar Laskri, 73, Algerian film director.
Paul Walter Myers, 82, British classical record producer.
Phyllis Rutledge, 83, American politician, member of the West Virginia House of Delegates (1968–1972, 1988–1994).
María Elena Velasco, 74, Mexican actress, comedian and film producer (La India María), stomach cancer.
Bob Wareing, 84, British politician, MP for Liverpool West Derby (1983–2010).
Colin Whitaker, 82, English footballer (Shrewsbury Town, Oldham Athletic).
Grace Lee Whitney, 85, American actress (Star Trek, Irma la Douce, Some Like It Hot).
Beth Whittall, 78, Canadian Olympic swimmer (1956), double Pan American champion (1955).

2
Stuart Archer, 100, British army colonel, recipient of the George Cross (1941).
Michael Blake, 69, American author and screenwriter (Dances with Wolves), Oscar winner (1991).
Guy Carawan, 87, American folk singer and civil rights activist.
José María Castiñeira de Dios, 94, Argentine poet, pneumonia.
Sarah Correa, 22, Brazilian swimmer, South American Games champion (2010), hit by car.
Philip S. Goodman, 89, American director, screenwriter and producer (We Shall Return, Profiles in Courage).
Konstantyn K. Kuzminsky, 75, Russian performance poet.
Ma Shui-long, 75, Taiwanese composer.
John Mahaffy, 96, Canadian ice hockey player (Montreal Canadiens, New York Rangers).
Ryan McHenry, 27, Scottish film director and social media personality (Vine), bone cancer.
Nick Mead, 93, British World War II Royal Navy officer.
Martin Nag, 88, Norwegian writer, stroke.
Rex Percy, 81, New Zealand rugby league player (Auckland, Balmain, national team).
Maya Plisetskaya, 89, Russian prima ballerina, heart attack.
Ruth Rendell, 85, English crime novelist (Inspector Wexford), stroke.
Bob Schmidt, 82, American baseball player (San Francisco Giants, Washington Senators, Cincinnati Reds).
Frank Snow, 74, American politician, lung cancer.
Norman Thaddeus Vane, 86, American screenwriter and film director (Frightmare).
Yu Pengnian, 93, Chinese real estate magnate and philanthropist.

3
Abdul Wahid Aresar, 65, Pakistani politician.
Revaz Chkheidze, 88, Georgian film director (Father of a Soldier, The Saplings).
Thomas A. Constantine, 76, American police superintendent, Administrator for the Drug Enforcement Administration (1994–1999).
John Elders, 84, English rugby union player (Leicester).
Margaret Garwood, 88, American opera composer, acute heart failure.
André Gruchet, 82, French Olympic cyclist (1956, 1960).
Alan Hall, 62, British cell biologist.
Bruce Barrymore Halpenny, 78, English military historian and author.
Danny Jones, 29, English rugby league footballer, heart attack.
Symphorian Thomas Keeprath, 84, Indian Roman Catholic prelate, Bishop of Jalandhar (1971–2007).
Zoran Lalović, 65, Serbian musician.
*Lu Ping, 87, Chinese politician and diplomat, cancer.
Harry Martin, 95, American judge.
Elizabeth Raybould, 89, British nurse and nursing educator.
Warren Smith, 99, American professional golfer.
*Su Wenmao, 86, Chinese xiangsheng actor.
Per Sundberg, 65, Swedish Olympic fencer.
Abdul Basit Usman, 40–41, Filipino fugitive, shot.
Tung Jeong, 84, Chinese-born American physicist.

4
Eva Aeppli, 90, Swiss artist.
Ann Barr, 85, British writer (The Official Sloane Ranger Handbook).
William Bast, 84, American screenwriter and author, Alzheimer's disease.
Ellen Albertini Dow, 101, American actress (The Wedding Singer, Patch Adams, Wedding Crashers), pneumonia.
Zhivko Gospodinov, 57, Bulgarian footballer.
Jesús Hermida, 77, Spanish journalist and broadcaster, stroke.
Marv Hubbard, 68, American football player (Oakland Raiders, Detroit Lions), prostate cancer.
Claude LaForge, 78, Canadian ice hockey player (Detroit Red Wings, Philadelphia Flyers, Montreal Canadiens).
Andrew Lewis, 44, Guyanese Olympic boxer (1992) and WBA welterweight champion (2001-2002), traffic collision.
Joshua Ozersky, 47, American food writer, drowned.
James Ritter, 84, American politician.
Matti Viljanen, 77, Finnish politician, MP (1979–1991).
William Willson, 93, British businessman (Aston Martin).
Vicente Joaquim Zico, 88, Brazilian Roman Catholic prelate, coadjutor Archbishop (1980–1990) and Archbishop of Belém do Pará (1990–2004).

5
Jobst Brandt, 80, American author and cyclist.
Michael Burns, 54, Irish Gaelic football player (Cork).
Jon Castañares, 90, Spanish economist and politician.
Gerard Davison, 47, Northern Irish Provisional IRA commander, shot.
Craig Gruber, 63, American rock musician (Rainbow, Bible Black), prostate cancer.
Oscar Holderer, 95, German-born American engineer, worked on Saturn V project.
Hans Jansen, 72, Dutch politician, MEP (since 2014), stroke.
Jimmy Jones, 87, English footballer.
Ralph Lainson, 88, British parasitologist.
Odd Lie, 88, Norwegian Olympic gymnast.
Bruce G. Lindsay, 68, American statistician, cancer.
Des O'Hagan, 81, Northern Irish politician (Workers' Party).

6
Novera Ahmed, 85, Bangladeshi sculptor.
Richard J. Bartlett, 89, American legislator, New York State Chief Administrative Judge of the Courts (1974–1979).
William Bronder, 84, American actor (Stand by Me, CHiPs).
Errol Brown, 71, Jamaican-born British singer (Hot Chocolate), liver cancer.
Jerome Cooper, 68, American jazz drummer, multiple myeloma.
Graham Harcourt, 81, British Olympic gymnast.
*Nicolas Huỳnh Văn Nghi, 88, Vietnamese Roman Catholic prelate, Bishop of Phan Thiết (1975–2005).
Denise McCluggage, 88, American racing car driver, journalist, author and photographer.
Michael O'Brien, 67, British historian of the Southern United States, cancer.
Anson D. Shupe, 67, American sociologist.
Janko Vranyczany-Dobrinović, 95, Croatian politician and diplomat.
Jim Wright, 92, American politician, member of the U.S. House of Representatives from Texas's 12th district (1955–1989), Speaker of the House (1987–1989).

7
Asim Thahit Abdullah al Khalaqi, 47, Saudi Arabian Guantanamo Bay detainee, kidney failure.
Michael Barratt Brown, 97, British economist and political activist.
Joey Brush, 59, American politician, member of the Georgia State Senate (1996–2004), traffic collision.
Víctor de la Lama, 95, Mexican Olympian 
Frank DiPascali, 58, American financier and fraudster, lung cancer.
John Dixon, 86, Australian cartoonist (Air Hawk and the Flying Doctors), stroke.
Sir Sam Edwards, 87, Welsh physicist.
Arieh Elias, 94, Israeli actor (Kazablan, The Boy Across the Street).
Sir Maurice Flanagan, 86, British businessman (Emirates).
Rigby Graham, 84, British painter.
Amalendu Guha, 91, Indian historian.
Thomas F. Lamb, 92, American politician, member of the Pennsylvania Senate (1969–1974) and House of Representatives (1959–1966).
Gilbert Lewis, 74, American actor (Pee-wee's Playhouse, Don Juan DeMarco, Candyman).
Józef Pazdur, 90, Polish Roman Catholic prelate, Auxiliary Bishop of Wrocław (1984–2000).
Jean de Croutte de Saint Martin, 82, French Olympic equestrian.

8
Zeki Alasya, 72, Turkish actor and director, liver disease.
Sir Edward Burgess, 87, British army general, Deputy Supreme Allied Commander Europe (1984–1987).
Chuck Dow, 83, American politician, member of the Maine House of Representatives (1971–1980) and Senate (1983–1990).
Thomas Herlihy, 58, American politician, State Senator for Connecticut's 8th District (1999–2009).
Mwepu Ilunga, 66, Congolese footballer.
Menashe Kadishman, 82, Israeli artist, recipient of the Israel Prize (1995).
Adriana Maraž, 84, Slovene graphic artist.
Bob Sandberg, 93, Canadian football player (Winnipeg Blue Bombers).
Juan Schwanner, 94, Hungarian-Chilean football player and coach.
Atanas Semerdzhiev, 90, Bulgarian politician, vice-president (1990–1992).
Phil Skoglund, 77, New Zealand lawn bowls player, triples world champion (1988).
Myriam Yardeni, 83, Israeli historian.
Notable people killed in the 2015 Pakistan Army Mil Mi-17 crash:
Leif Holger Larsen, 61, Norwegian diplomat, Ambassador to Pakistan (since 2014).
Domingo Lucenario, Jr., 54, Filipino diplomat, Ambassador to Pakistan (since 2013).

9
Buddy Corlett, 93, Canadian-born New Zealand softball and basketball player.
Russell Dermond, 78, American Olympic sprint canoer (1956).
Berry Avant Edenfield, 80, American federal judge and politician, U.S. District Court Judge for the Southern District of Georgia (1978–2006), member of the Georgia State Senate (1965–1966), lung cancer.
Edward W. Estlow, 95, American football player, journalist and businessman (E. W. Scripps Company).
Kenan Evren, 97, Turkish military officer and coup leader, Chief of the General Staff (1978–1983), President (1980–1989).
Johnny Gimble, 88, American country music fiddler.
Igor Gorynin, 89, Russian metallurgist.
Ton Hartsuiker, 81, Dutch pianist and director of music academies.
Alexandre Lamfalussy, 86, Hungarian-born Belgian economist.
*Lo Wing-lok, 60, Hong Kong politician, member of the Legislative Council for Medical (2000–2004), lung cancer.
Michael MacKellar, 76, Australian politician, MP for Warringah (1969–1994).
Odo Marquard, 87, German philosopher.
Đorđe Pavlić, 76, Serbian Yugoslav footballer.
Ragne Tangen, 88, Norwegian children's television presenter.
Elizabeth Wilson, 94, American actress (The Birds, The Graduate, 9 to 5), Tony Award winner (1972).
Christopher Wood, 79, English novelist and screenwriter (Moonraker, Remo Williams: The Adventure Begins, The Spy Who Loved Me).

10
Chukwuma Azikiwe, 75, Nigerian politician.
Ray Baillie, 80, Canadian football player (Montreal Alouettes), fall.
Ninad Bedekar, 65, Indian historian and writer.
Jack Body, 70, New Zealand composer.
Chris Burden, 69, American artist, melanoma.
Al Cartwright, 97, American sportswriter.
William T. Cooper, 81, Australian bird illustrator.
Mario Da Vinci, 73, Italian Canzone Napoletana singer and actor.
Jerry Dior, 82, American graphic designer, creator of the Major League Baseball logo, colorectal cancer.
Juan Emery, 82, Spanish footballer.
Luiz Henrique da Silveira, 75, Brazilian politician, Senator (since 2011), Governor of Santa Catarina (2003–2006, 2007–2010), Minister of Science and Technology (1987–1988), heart attack.
Kim Kyok-sik, 76, North Korean military officer, Defence Minister (2012–2013), acute respiratory failure.
Donald Neff, 84, American journalist and author, coronary heart disease and diabetes.
James F. Rinehart, 64, American academic.
Mario Rodríguez, 77, Argentine footballer (Chacarita Juniors, Independiente).
Jindřich Roudný, 91, Czech Olympic steeplechase athlete (1952).
Rachel Rosenthal, 88, French-born American performance artist, heart failure.
Victor Salvi, 95, American-born Italian harpist and harp maker.
Barbara Turnbull, 50, Canadian journalist and disability campaigner.
Davey Whitney, 85, American Hall of Fame basketball coach (Alcorn State).

11
Maggie Black, 85, American ballet instructor, heart failure.
Alan Borovoy, 83, Canadian human rights activist and lawyer.
Donna Jean Christianson, 83, American politician, cancer.
Stan Cornyn, 81, American record label executive.
Pierre Daboval, 96, French artist.
Peter Füri, 77, Swiss footballer (Concordia Basel, F.C. Basel), heart failure.
Jef Geeraerts, 85, Belgian author, heart attack.
Kay Heim, 97, Canadian baseball player (Kenosha Comets).
John Hewie, 87, Scottish footballer (Charlton Athletic, Arcadia Shepherds).
Olavi Lanu, 89, Finnish sculptor.
Bob Light, 88, American college basketball coach (Appalachian State).
Frank Matich, 80, Australian racing car driver.
Leonardo Neher, 92, American diplomat.
Glen Orbik, 51, American artist.
Mohammad-Ali Sepanlou, 75, Iranian poet.
Gideon Singer, 88, Israeli actor and singer.
Eldridge Small, 65, American football player (New York Giants).
Frankie Sodano, 84, American Olympic boxer (1948).
Isobel Varley, 77, British tattooed woman, world's most tattooed senior, Alzheimer's disease.
Derek Walker, 85, British architect.
Sir John Watts, 93, Grenadian politician, President of the Senate (1988–1990, 1995–2004).
Richard W. Winder, 91, American LDS church elder.

12
Cecil Jones Attuquayefio, 70, Ghanaian football player and coach, throat cancer.
Tony Ayala Jr., 52, American light middleweight boxer.
Suchitra Bhattacharya, 65, Indian novelist, left ventricular failure.
Mervyn Burtch, 86, Welsh composer.
John Colenback, 79, American actor (As the World Turns), chronic obstructive pulmonary disease.
John Dewes, 88, English cricketer (Middlesex, national team).
Sir Peter Fry, 83, British politician, MP for Wellingborough (1969–1997).
Peter Gay, 91, German-born American historian.
Bill Guthridge, 77, American college basketball coach (University of North Carolina).
Rachel Jacobs, 39, American entrepreneur, injuries sustained in a train derailment.
Bobby Jameson, 70, American pop singer and songwriter.
Syd Lieberman, 71, American storyteller.
William MacDonald, 90, English-born Australian serial killer.
Evany José Metzker, 67, Brazilian journalist, homicide.
Saulat Mirza, 43–44, Pakistani convicted murderer and political activist, execution by hanging.
Ruth Mompati, 89, South African politician (1956 Women's March).
Robin Page, 82, British artist.
John Slater, 63, Canadian politician, MLA for Boundary-Similkameen (2009–2013).
Neranjan Wickremasinghe, 53, Sri Lankan politician.
Anthony C. Yu, 76, American translator (Journey to the West) and literature scholar, heart failure.
William Zinsser, 92, American writer.

13
Earl Averill, Jr., 83, American baseball player (Los Angeles Angels, Chicago Cubs).
Eric Bakie, 87, Scottish footballer (Dunfermline Athletic, Aberdeen).
Kathryn I. Bowers, 72, American politician, member of the Tennessee House of Representatives (1995–2005) and Senate (2005–2007).
Derek Davis, 67, Irish broadcaster (Live at 3).
Gill Dennis, 74, American screenwriter (Walk the Line, Return to Oz).
Robert Drasnin, 87, American composer and clarinet player, complications from a fall.
Lucy Fabery, 84, Puerto Rican jazz singer.
Romolo Ferri, 86, Italian motorcycle racer.
Joseph Fidel, 91, American politician.
Ed Fouhy, 80, American journalist and television news executive (ABC, CBS, NBC), complications from cancer.
George W. Haley, 89, American politician and diplomat.
Bert Hitchen, 76, English railway preservationist and racing cyclist.
Anna Levinson, 76, German zoologist.
Nina Otkalenko, 86, Russian athlete.
Bob Randall, c. 81, Australian Indigenous musician and author.
David Sackett, 80, Canadian physician.
Gainan Saidkhuzhin, 77, Russian Soviet Olympic cyclist (1960, 1964), heart attack.
Stanley Sproul, 95, American politician, Mayor of Augusta, Maine (1971–1974), member of the Maine House of Representatives (1973–1974).
Marisa Volpi, 86, Italian art historian and writer.

14
James H. Andreasen, 83, American judge.
Geraldo Majela de Castro, 84, Brazilian Roman Catholic prelate, Coadjutor Bishop (1982–1988) and Archbishop of Montes Claros (1988–2007).
Charles Favre, 54, Swiss Olympic sailor.
B.B. King, 89, American Hall of Fame blues guitarist, singer and songwriter ("The Thrill Is Gone"), complications from Alzheimer's disease.
Thomas Lothian, 86, American politician and academic.
Micheál O'Brien, 91, Irish Gaelic footballer and hurler (Meath).
Stanton J. Peale, 78, American astrophysicist.
Mariana Pfaelzer, 89, American federal judge, U.S. District Court Judge for the Central District of California (1978–1997).
Jean Pliya, 83, Beninese playwright and short story writer.
Franz Wright, 62, American poet, lung cancer.
Zdzisław Żygulski, Jr., 93, Polish art historian.

15
Ortheia Barnes, 70, American R&B and jazz singer, heart failure.
Elisabeth Bing, 100, German physical therapist, author and proponent of natural childbirth.
Jackie Brookner, 69, American artist, cancer.
Michael Campus, 80, American director, producer, and screenwriter (The Mack).
Samih Darwazah, 85, Jordanian executive (Hikma Pharmaceuticals).
Alfred DelBello, 80, American politician, Lieutenant Governor of New York (1983–1985), Westchester County Executive (1974–1982), Mayor of Yonkers, New York (1970–1974).
Tommy Dunne, 83, Irish international footballer.
Corey Hill, 36, American mixed martial artist (UFC), collapsed lung and heart attack.
Bob Hopkins, 80, American basketball player (Syracuse Nationals) and coach (Seattle SuperSonics), heart and kidney failure.
John Jarvis-Smith, 93, British World War II naval officer and shipbroker.
Jacob Jensen, 89, Danish industrial designer.
Matulidi Jusoh, 57, Malaysian politician, MP for Dungun (2008–2013), diabetes.
André Jean René Lacrampe, 73, French Roman Catholic prelate, Bishop of Ajaccio (1995–2003) and Archbishop of Besançon (2003–2013).
Claude Lajoie, 87, Canadian politician.
John Lo Schiavo, 90, American Jesuit and educator, President of University of San Francisco (1977–1991).
Flora MacNeil, 86, Scottish Gaelic singer.
Carlos Maggi, 92, Uruguayan writer (Generación del 45).
Valentina Maureira, 14, Chilean euthanasia advocate, cystic fibrosis.
Didi Petet, 58, Indonesian actor.
John Stephenson, 91, American voice actor (The Flintstones, The Transformers, Jonny Quest), Alzheimer's disease.
James Takemori, 89, American judo coach.
Donald Wrye, 77, American film director (Ice Castles).
Garo Yepremian, 70, Cypriot-born American football player (Miami Dolphins), brain cancer.
Renzo Zorzi, 68, Italian racing driver.

16
Jackie Basehart, 63, American-born Italian actor (The Inglorious Bastards).
Prashant Bhargava, 42, American filmmaker, cardiac arrest.
Nelson Doi, 93, American politician, Lieutenant Governor of Hawaii (1974–1978).
Ernesto Estrada, 65, Filipino basketball player, heart attack.
Johannes Exner, 89, Danish architect.
Elias Gleizer, 81, Brazilian actor, circulatory failure.
Shikha Joshi, 40, Indian actress (B.A. Pass).
Adam Kilgarriff, 55, English linguist.
Moshe Levinger, 80, Israeli Orthodox rabbi.
Dean Potter, 43, American rock climber, BASE-jumping accident.
Adrian Robinson, 25, American football player (Pittsburgh Steelers, Temple Owls), suicide by hanging.
Abu Sayyaf, Tunisian senior ISIS commander, head of oil operations, shot.
Peter Tallberg, 77, Finnish Olympic sailor (1960, 1964, 1968, 1972, 1980) and IOC member.
Syd Tate, 90, Australian VFL football player (Geelong).
John Templeton, Jr., 75, American physician and philanthropist, brain cancer.
Raphael Tenthani, 43, Malawian journalist, traffic collision.
Dominik Tóth, 89, Slovak Roman Catholic prelate, Auxiliary Bishop of Bratislava (1990–2004).
Yeung Kwong, 89, Hong Kong pro-communist activist.
Ahmed Zanna, 60, Nigerian politician, Senator for Borno Central (since 2011).

17
Claude Carliez, 90, French fencer and stunt director (Moonraker, A View to a Kill).
Chinx, 31, American rapper, shot.
Óscar Collazos, 72, Colombian writer.
Sheshrao Deshmukh, 85, Indian politician.
Margaret Dunning, 104, American philanthropist, fall.
Rex Garner, 94, British actor and theatre director.
Leo Honkala, 82, Finnish wrestler, Olympic bronze medalist (1952).
Keiji Matsumoto, 65, Japanese racing driver.
Nancy Masterton, 84, American politician, member of the Maine House of Representatives.
Michael Alfred Peszke, 83, Polish-born American psychiatrist and historian.
S. W. Schmitthenner, 87, American missionary, President of Andhra Evangelical Lutheran Church (1969–1981).
Gerald Steadman Smith, 85, Canadian artist.
Don Smoothey, 96, British actor and comedian.
Tranquility Bass, 47, American hip-hop musician.

18
Frank Pierpoint Appleby, 101, Canadian politician.
Norm Armstrong, 89, Australian football player.
Halldór Ásgrímsson, 67, Icelandic politician, Prime Minister (2004–2006), heart attack.
Tommy Bing, 83, English footballer (Margate).
Dewi Bridges, 81, Welsh Anglican prelate, Bishop of Swansea and Brecon (1988–1998).
Helen Davis, 88, American politician, member of the Florida House of Representatives and Senate.
Raymond Gosling, 88, British scientist.
Hasanuzzaman Khan, 88, Bangladeshi journalist.
Steiner Arvid Kvalø, 92, Norwegian politician.
Al Matsalla, 89, Canadian politician.
Dick Mountjoy, 83, American politician, Mayor of Monrovia, California (1968–1976), member of the California State Assembly (1978–1995) and Senate (1995–2000), heart attack.
Eli M. Pearce, 86, American chemist.
Harald Seeger, 93, German football player (1. FC Union Berlin) and manager.
Roland Sink, 89, American Olympic athlete.
Jean-François Théodore, 68, French executive (Euronext).
Elbert West, 47, American country music singer-songwriter ("Sticks and Stones").

19
Ahmad Alaskarov, 79, Azerbaijani football player and manager.
Jack Aspinwall, 82, British politician, MP (1979–1997), cancer.
Joseph J. Barnicke, 92, Canadian real estate magnate.
Joe Carr, 83, Scottish footballer (St Johnstone).
James Findlay, 60, Australian Olympic swimmer.
Sir Thomas Gault, 76, New Zealand jurist.
Edmond J. Gong, 84, American politician, member of the Florida House of Representatives (1963–1966) and Senate (1967–1971).
Gerald Götting, 91, German politician, President of the East German People's Chamber (1969–1976).
Fahd Jaradat, 84–85, Jordanian politician, Finance Minister (1970).
Bruce Lundvall, 79, American record executive (Blue Note Records), complications of Parkinson's disease.
Ted McWhinney, 91, Australian-born Canadian politician and academic.
Yevgeni Menshov, 68, Russian actor and presenter.
Burhan Muhammad, 57, Indonesian diplomat, Ambassador to Pakistan (since 2012), burns from helicopter crash.
Dale D. Myers, 93, American aerospace engineer, Deputy Administrator of NASA (1986–1989).
S. V. Raju, 81, Indian politician.
Happy Rockefeller, 88, American socialite and philanthropist, Second Lady of the United States (1974–1977), First Lady of New York (1963–1973).
State of Bengal, 50, Bangladeshi-born British DJ and music producer.
Roger J. Thomas, 73, American physicist.
Robert S. Wistrich, 70, Kazakh-born Israeli-British history professor, heart attack.

20
Edward Adeane, 75, British courtier, Private Secretary to the Prince of Wales (1979–1985).
Billy Baggett, 85, American football player (Dallas Texans).
Bob Belden, 58, American musician, heart attack.
Abdelaziz Bennani, 79, Moroccan army general.
Sir Brian Cubbon, 87, British civil servant, Permanent Secretary of the Home Office (1979–1988), heart attack.
Harald Eriksson, 93, Swedish cross-country skier, Olympic silver medalist (1948).
Eileen Gray, 95, British bicycle racer.
J. S. Harry, 76, Australian poet.
Ebba Hentze, 84, Faroese writer.
Kirsten Idebøen, 52, Norwegian financier (SpareBank 1).
Sir John Lea, 91, British Royal Navy vice-admiral.
Paul Liao, 67, Taiwanese entrepreneur, lung cancer.
Chifita Matafwali, 55, Zambian politician, member of the National Assembly for Bangweulu (since 2011).
Manfred Müller, 88, German Roman Catholic prelate, Auxiliary Bishop of Augsburg (1972–1982) and Bishop of Regensburg (1982–2002).
Bob Priestley, 95, American football player (Philadelphia Eagles).
Jan Prochyra, 66, Polish actor.
Femi Robinson, 74, Nigerian actor (The Village Headmaster).
Sudha Shivpuri, 77, Indian actress (Kyunki Saas Bhi Kabhi Bahu Thi), multiple organ failure.
Mary Ellen Trainor, 62, American actress (Lethal Weapon, Die Hard, The Goonies), pancreatic cancer.
Livien Ven, 81, Belgian Olympic rower.

21
Jassem Al-Kharafi, 75, Kuwaiti magnate and politician, Speaker of the National Assembly (1999–2011), heart attack.
Zaya Avdysh, 69, Ukrainian football player and manager.
David Blake, 90, English cricketer (Hampshire).
César Boutteville, 97, Vietnamese-born French chess player.
Eduard Derzsei, 80, Romanian Olympic volleyball player.
Joaquim Durão, 84, Portuguese chess player.
Anne Duguël, 69, Belgian author.
Fred Gladding, 78, American baseball player (Detroit Tigers, Houston Astros).
Ernie Hannigan, 72, Scottish footballer (Preston North End, Coventry City).
Louis Johnson, 60, American bassist (The Brothers Johnson, Michael Jackson).
Martin Kitcher, 53, British singer-songwriter.
James McDuffie, 85, American politician, member of the North Carolina Senate (1975–1987).
Juan Molinar Horcasitas, 59, Mexican politician, amyotrophic lateral sclerosis.
Marty Pasetta, 82, American television producer and director, traffic collision.
Annarita Sidoti, 44, Italian race walker, world champion (1997), breast cancer.
Ellen Tronnier, 87, American baseball player (South Bend Blue Sox).
Twinkle, 66, British singer-songwriter ("Terry"), cancer.
Alan Woodward, 68, English footballer (Sheffield United).

22
Albert Baciocco, 84, American vice admiral.
Marques Haynes, 89, American Hall of Fame basketball player (Harlem Globetrotters).
Sir John Horlock, 87, British mechanical engineer and university vice-chancellor (Open University, University of Salford).
Kevin Hunt, 66, American football player.
Vladimir Katriuk, 93, Romanian-born Canadian alleged war criminal.
Alan Koch, 77, American baseball player (Detroit Tigers, Washington Senators).
Michel Mortier, 90, French interior designer and architect.
John Mosley, 93, American football player (Colorado A&M Aggies) and World War II RAF officer (Tuskegee Airmen).
Radomir Naumov, 68, Serbian politician, Minister of Energy and Mining (2004–2007), Minister of Religion (2007–2008).
Aminah Robinson, 75, American artist.
Jean-Luc Sassus, 52, French football player, heart attack.
Byron Sherwin, 69, American rabbi and theology scholar.
Terry Sue-Patt, 50, British actor (Grange Hill). (body discovered on this date)
Michael Osborne Waddell, 92, British World War II army officer and Military Cross recipient.

23
Hugh Ambrose, 48, American historian and author (The Pacific), cancer.
Marcus Belgrave, 78, American jazz trumpeter, heart failure.
Leo Berman, 79, American businessman and politician, member of the Texas House of Representatives (1999–2013), lymphoma.
Hugh Boyle, 79, Irish golfer.
Moyra Caldecott, 87, South African-born British writer.
John Carter, 87, American actor (Barnaby Jones, Scarface, Law & Order), pneumonia.
Peter Corbett, 74, South African cricketer.
Trojan Darveniza, 93, Australian football player.
Zedi Feruzi, Burundian politician, shot.
Boody Gilbertson, 93, American basketball player (Sheboygan Red Skins).
Andy Hess, 91, American politician.
Yrjö Mäkelä, 88, Finnish Olympic athlete.
Anne Meara, 85, American comedian (Stiller and Meara) and actress (Archie Bunker's Place, The King of Queens, Like Mike).
Aleksey Mozgovoy, 40, Ukrainian pro-Russian separatist.
Alicia Nash, 82, Salvadoran-born American socialite and mental health care advocate, traffic collision.
John Forbes Nash, Jr., 86, American mathematician, laureate of the Nobel Prize in Economics (1994), subject of A Beautiful Mind, traffic collision.
Carl Nesjar, 94, Norwegian painter and sculptor.
Asbjørn Øksendal, 92, Norwegian writer.
Andres Ortiz, 28, Puerto Rican basketball player, traffic collision.
Ali Raymi, 41, Yemeni boxer, air strike.
Carole Seymour-Jones, 72, Welsh biographer.
Joseph Velikonja, 92, Slovene-born American geographer.
Carlos Irizarry Yunqué, 93, Puerto Rican judge, justice of the Supreme Court (1973–1986).

24
Morris Beckman, 94, English writer and anti-fascist activist (43 Group).
Dean Carroll, 52, English rugby league footballer.
Krushna Ghoda, 61, Indian politician, MLA for Palghar (since 2014), heart attack.
Cristian Gómez, 27, Argentine footballer (Club Atlético Paraná), heart attack.
Vladimír Hagara, 71, Slovak footballer (FC Spartak Trnava).
John H. Kerr III, 79, American politician.
Sir Kenneth Jacobs, 97, Australian judge.
Krzysztof Kąkolewski, 85, Polish writer.
Tanith Lee, 67, British science fiction, horror and fantasy writer (Blake's 7), breast cancer.
Daniel Meltzer, 63, American lawyer, legal adviser to Barack Obama, cancer.
Guido Plante, 78, Canadian-born Honduran Roman Catholic prelate, Coadjutor Bishop (2004–2005) and Bishop of Choluteca (2005–2012).
Pedro Roque, 47, Cuban Greco-Roman wrestler, world champion (1987), respiratory failure.
Michael W. Ryan, 66, American convicted murderer.
Jarmila Šťastná, 82, Czech Olympic speed skater.
Bharat Raj Upreti, 63, Nepali judge, justice of the Supreme Court (2009–2013), suicide by hanging.
Winged Love, 23, Irish Thoroughbred racehorse, colic.

25
George Braden, 65, Canadian politician, member of the Legislative Assembly of the Northwest Territories (1979–1983), gastric cancer.
Dien Cornelissen, 91, Dutch politician, member of the Senate (1969–1971) and House of Representatives (1971–1972, 1973–1986).
Robert Lebel, 90, Canadian Roman Catholic prelate, Bishop of Valleyfield (1976–2000).
Nathan J. Lindsay, 79, American major general (USAF) and astronaut.
Mary Ellen Mark, 75, American photographer, myelodysplastic syndrome.
Moc Morgan, 86, Welsh fly fisherman and naturalist.
John M. Murphy, 88, American politician, member of the U.S. House of Representatives from New York's 16th (1963–1973) and 17th (1973–1981) districts.
Bill O'Herlihy, 76, Irish sports broadcaster (RTÉ Sport).
Jorge Salomão, 77, Brazilian Olympic boxer.
Wallace Sampson, 85, American critic of alternative medicine.
John Stubbs, 77, Australian political journalist.
Zhanna Yorkina, 76, Russian Soviet cosmonaut.

26
Vicente Aranda, 88, Spanish film director (Amantes).
Walter Byers, 93, American college athletics executive (NCAA), urinary tract infection.
Claudio Caligari, 67, Italian screenwriter and director (Toxic Love, The Scent of the Night).
Harold F. Clayton, 61, American sculptor, lung cancer.
William Davidson, 95, English cricketer (Sussex).
Gottfried Diener, 88, Swiss bobsledder, Olympic champion (1956).
Leo Drey, 98, American timber magnate.
Rocky Frisco, 77, American pianist (JJ Cale Band).
Thorbjørn Gjølstad, 72, Norwegian jurist and civil servant.
Franklin P. Hall, 76, American politician, member of the Virginia House of Delegates (1976–2009).
Bob Hornery, 83, Australian actor (Neighbours, Mad Max Beyond Thunderdome, The Importance of Being Earnest).
Les Johnson, 90, Australian politician, MP for Hughes (1955–1966, 1969–1983).
Sverre Johan Juvik, 93, Norwegian politician.
Robert Kraft, 87, American astronomer.
João Lucas, 35, Portuguese footballer (Académica).
Ubirajara Ribeiro Martins, 82, Brazilian entomologist.
Edward Moylan, 91, American tennis player.
John Pinder, 70, New Zealand-born Australian comedy producer.
Cyril Roger, 93, English speedway rider.
Art Thieme, 73, American folk musician.
Aristidis Vlassis, 68, Greek painter.

27
Hassan Abdullah Hersi al-Turki, c. 71, Somali Islamist and Al-Shabaab leader, military leader of the Islamic Courts Union and Al-Itihaad al-Islamiya.
Erik Carlsson, 86, Swedish rally driver.
Nils Christie, 87, Norwegian criminologist.
Cotton Coulson, 63, American filmmaker and photographer (National Geographic), scuba diving accident.
Peter Celestine Elampassery, 76, Indian Roman Catholic prelate, Bishop of Jammu-Srinagar (1998–2014).
Vittorio Paolo Fiorito, 74, Italian Hall of Fame basketball referee.
Bill Foster, 79, American college basketball coach (Miami Hurricanes, Clemson Tigers, Virginia Tech Hokies), Parkinson's disease.
S. Parker Gilbert, 81, American financier, President of Morgan Stanley (1983–1990).
Irvine B. Hill, 87, American politician, Mayor of Norfolk, Virginia (1974–1976).
Sir Gordon Hobday, 99, British scientist and industrialist.
Andy King, 58, English footballer (Everton), heart attack.
Karsten Lund, 71, Danish footballer (Vejle Boldklub).
Michael Martin, 83, American philosopher.
John Miller, 81, American football player (Washington Redskins).
William Newman, 80, American actor (Mrs. Doubtfire, The Tick), vascular dementia.
Liam Ryan, 79, Irish theologian and hurler (Limerick GAA).
Franca Sebastiani, 66, Italian singer, cancer.
John Siegal, 97, American football player (Chicago Bears).
Elisabeth Wiedemann, 89, German actress.
Zhang Jieqing, 102, Chinese politician and writer.

28
John Buckner, 67, American politician, member of the Colorado House of Representatives (since 2013), sarcoidosis.
Jonas Čepulis, 75, Lithuanian heavyweight boxer, Olympic silver medalist (1968).
Masayuki Imai, 54, Japanese actor, writer and director, colon cancer.
Esther Ghan Firestone, 90, Canadian cantor.
Steven Gerber, 66, American composer, cancer.
Johnny Keating, 87, British musician ("Theme from Z-Cars").
Skeeter Kell, 85, American baseball player (Philadelphia Athletics).
Ray Kennedy, 58, American jazz pianist, multiple sclerosis.
Gyles Longley, 96, British World War II army officer and Military Cross recipient.
Robert S. Morse, 90, American prelate, Archbishop of the Anglican Province of Christ the King.
Reynaldo Rey, 75, American actor and comedian (227, Friday, White Men Can't Jump), stroke.
Claire Kelly Schultz, 90, American information scientist.

29
Martha Bachem, 90, Austrian Olympic figure skater.
Arthur Bourns, 95, American chemist, President of McMaster University (1972–1980).
Henry Carr, 73, American track and field athlete, Olympic champion (1964), cancer.
Doris Hart, 89, American Hall of Fame tennis player.
Willie Horgan, 71, Irish hurling referee.
Tom Jones, 72, American racing driver.
Chris Kohlhase, 47, New Zealand softball player (national team) and coach (Samoa national team), Parkinson's disease.
Natalya Lagoda, 42, Ukrainian-born Russian singer and model (Playboy), bilateral pneumonia.
Rashid Massumi, 89, Iranian-born American cardiologist.
Wim van Norden, 97, Dutch journalist, director of Het Parool (1945–1979).
Betsy Palmer, 88, American actress (I've Got a Secret, Mister Roberts, Friday the 13th).
Bruno Pesaola, 89, Argentine-born Italian footballer.

30
Michel Arpin, 79, French Olympic skier.
Jim Bailey, 77, American singer, actor and impressionist (Judy Garland, Barbra Streisand).
Beau Biden, 46, American politician, Attorney General of Delaware (2007–2015), brain cancer.
Joël Champetier, 57, Canadian author, cancer.
Jake D'Arcy, 69, British actor (Still Game, Gregory's Girl, Outnumbered).
John Drinkall, 93, British diplomat, Ambassador to Afghanistan (1972–1976), High Commissioner to Jamaica (1976–1981).
Ingeborg Mueller Fernlund, 80, Swedish publisher.
Hugh Griffiths, Baron Griffiths, 91, British jurist and law lord.
Julie Harris, 94, British costume designer (A Hard Day's Night, Darling, Live and Let Die), Oscar winner (1966).
Ivan Kochergin, 79, Russian Olympic wrestler.
John L. Lumley, 84, American professor of aerospace engineering, brain cancer.
Tony McNamara, 85, English footballer (Everton, Liverpool).
Lennie Merullo, 98, American baseball player (Chicago Cubs).
Cornell Moss, 55, Bahamian Anglican prelate, Archbishop of Guyana (since 2009), heart failure.
L. Tom Perry, 92, American apostle of the Church of Jesus Christ of Latter-day Saints, thyroid cancer.
Michael Collins Piper, 54, American talk radio host and conspiracy theorist.
Azmat Rana, 63, Pakistani cricketer, cardiac arrest.
Somalatha Subasinghe, 78, Sri Lankan actress and theater director.
Alvin P. Wegeman, 88, American Nordic combined skier.

31
Iain Campbell, 87, English cricketer and headmaster.
Nico Castel, 83, Portuguese-born American tenor.
Will Holt, 86, American songwriter ("Lemon Tree") and playwright (Over Here!), Alzheimer's disease.
Jonathan Howes, 78, American politician, Secretary of the NCDENR (1992–1997), Mayor of Chapel Hill, North Carolina (1987–1991), heart disease.
Françoise-Hélène Jourda, 59, French architect.
Hiroshi Koizumi, 88, Japanese actor (Mothra, Atragon), pneumonia.
François Mahé, 84, French professional cyclist.
Frank McKinnon, 80, Canadian sports executive.
Pat Petersen, 55, American marathon runner, pancreatic cancer.
Christina Reid, 73, Northern Irish playwright.
Slim Richey, 77, American guitarist, lymphoma.
Mario Saliwa, 31, South African first-class cricketer.
Gladys Taylor, 97, Canadian writer and newspaper publisher.
Karl Wlaschek, 97, Austrian executive, founder of Billa.

References

2015-05
 05